Clinton R. Nixon is a designer and publisher of indie role-playing games.

Career
He is the designer and publisher of The Shadow of Yesterday, Donjon, Paladin, and others.

He co-administered the Forge with Ron Edwards, after they brought the site back in early 2001 at indie-rpgs.com, and they spent the next six years making the site successful. Nixon is a proponent of independent publishing in general and independent game publishing in particular.

Nixon has worked in software development, including programming for startup companies such as Lulu and directing a team of developers for the web consulting firm Viget. He started his own web development company in 2011.

References

External links
 Clinton Dreisbach's web site
 Interview with Clinton R. Nixon (2005)

Indie role-playing game designers
Living people
Role-playing game designers
Year of birth missing (living people)